The Holy Trinity Church at Parker and Hector St. in Trinidad, California was built in 1873.  It was listed on the National Register of Historic Places in 1980.

The wood-frame building has a gable roof and a small steeple.  The steeple replaced a slightly larger sometime between 1907 and 1954.
Sixty people can sit in the long wooden pews with another 18 sitting in the choir loft.

References

External links
Catholic Directory

Churches on the National Register of Historic Places in California
Carpenter Gothic church buildings in California
Churches completed in 1873
Buildings and structures in Humboldt County, California
National Register of Historic Places in Humboldt County, California
1873 establishments in California